Gerald Michael Ciolek (born 19 September 1986) is a German former professional road bicycle racer, who rode professionally between 2005 and 2016. He currently works as a directeur sportif for UCI Continental team .

Career 
He won the German National Road Race Championships aged 18, the youngest ever rider to do so. Ciolek was able to overcome seasoned sprinters Erik Zabel and Robert Förster without help from any teammates, ending the twelve-year domination of T-Mobile. Besides winning the national championship, he secured three stage victories and the points competition at the Tour de Hongrie, and a stage victory at the Mainfranken Tour.

In 2006, Ciolek completed his training at the Ford Motor Company and was able to turn professional and devote his career to cycling. Through the season, he rode strongly and secured a number of high placings in important races to prove he could challenge, and beat, the strongest sprinters in UCI ProTour teams. Ciolek had an excellent second placing at the Rund um den Henninger Turm, where he once again beat Erik Zabel. Since Ciolek's AKUD Arnolds Sicherheit team merged with Team Wiesenhof at the beginning of the season to be the strongest German team outside of the UCI ProTour, they were able to secure wild card entries to a number of ProTour events where Ciolek shone even more. At the Vattenfall Cyclassics, Ciolek secured fifth place. A few weeks later, Ciolek won his first UCI ProTour event at the Tour of Germany, where he won stage three. On 23 September he won U23 Road Race World Championship in Salzburg.

After a relatively quiet early season, he came from behind to win the Rheinland-Pfalz Rundfahrt in May. He then caught fire in August, when he took three stages of the Deutschland Tour and was a fast-charging third in the Vattenfall Cyclassics.

During 2008, he was a stage winner in Sparkassencup Schwenningen, and won two stages in the Bayern Rundfahrt. In the Tour de France, Ciolek was an instrumental figure in all four of Mark Cavendish's stage wins. On the final stage on the Champs-Élysées Ciolek managed to finish second to Gert Steegmans. He participated in the Olympic Games Road Race but had to abandon due to the effect the extreme conditions had on him. However, in September, he was able to bounce back and claim the fifth stage of the Deutschland Tour in an uphill sprint finish.

In his first year with the team, Ciolek won Milan–San Remo, in a time of 5 hours, 37 minutes and 20 seconds, holding off favourites Peter Sagan and Fabian Cancellara in the sprint finish.

Major results

2004
 Trofeo Karlsberg
1st Stages 2 & 4
 9th Overall Niedersachsen Rundfahrt Juniors
1st Stage 1
2005
 1st  Road race, National Road Championships
 Tour de Hongrie
1st  Points classification
1st Stages 3, 7 & 8
 1st Stage 3 Mainfranken-Tour
 8th Grand Prix de Waregem
2006
 1st  Road race, UCI Under-23 Road World Championships
 1st Rund um die Nürnberger Altstadt
 1st Stage 3 Deutschland Tour
 2nd Rund um den Henninger Turm
 5th Vattenfall Cyclassics
 6th Overall Istrian Spring Trophy
1st Stage 3
 8th Overall Niedersachsen Rundfahrt
1st  Young rider classification
 8th Neuseen Classics
2007
 1st  Overall Rheinland-Pfalz Rundfahrt
1st  Sprints classification
1st  Young rider classification
 Deutschland Tour
1st Stages 6, 7 & 9
 Tour of Austria
1st Points classification
1st Stages 2 & 8
 1st Stage 1 3-Länder-Tour
 2nd Münsterland Giro
 3rd Overall Niedersachsen Rundfahrt
1st Stage 3
 3rd Vattenfall Cyclassics
 8th Overall Ster Elektrotoer
2008
 1st Stage 5 Deutschland Tour
 3rd Road race, National Road Championships
 5th Overall Bayern Rundfahrt
1st Stages 1 & 3
2009
 Vuelta a Mallorca
1st Trofeo Calvià
5th Trofeo Pollença
 1st Stage 2 Vuelta a España
 2nd Sparkassen Giro Bochum
 3rd Vattenfall Cyclassics
 9th Neuseen Classics
2010
 1st Stage 3 Bayern Rundfahrt
 5th Overall Four Days of Dunkirk
 5th Binche–Tournai–Binche
 6th Overall Circuit Franco-Belge
2011
 2nd Road race, National Road Championships
 2nd Vattenfall Cyclassics
 9th Grand Prix Cycliste de Québec
2012
 1st Stage 4 Volta ao Algarve
 1st Stage 2b (TTT) Tour de l'Ain
 9th Grand Prix Cycliste de Québec
 10th Trofeo Deià
2013
 1st Milan–San Remo
 1st Stage 2 Driedaagse van West-Vlaanderen
 1st Stage 2 Tour of Britain
 1st Stage 6 Tour of Austria
 2nd Road race, National Road Championships
 5th Trofeo Laigueglia
 5th Eschborn–Frankfurt City Loop
 6th Brussels Cycling Classic
 10th Overall Bayern Rundfahrt
1st Stage 3
 10th Schaal Sels
2014
 1st Stage 3 Vuelta a Andalucía
 3rd Rund um Köln
 5th Overall Tour of Norway
 8th Le Samyn
 9th Milan–San Remo
2015
 6th Velothon Berlin
2016
 5th Road race, National Road Championships
 6th Rund um Köln

Grand Tour general classification results timeline

References

External links 

Gerald Ciolek's profile on Cycling Base 

1986 births
Living people
German male cyclists
German Vuelta a España stage winners
German cycling road race champions
Cyclists from Cologne
Cyclists at the 2008 Summer Olympics
Olympic cyclists of Germany
21st-century German people